The Bănești or Cicănești is a right tributary of the river Argeș in Romania. It flows into the Argeș in Dobrotu.

References

Rivers of Romania
Rivers of Argeș County